This is a list of Great Lakes museum and historic ships, including surviving hulls, museum or historic ships at risk, other surviving historic hulls and notable partial ships.

Museum ships and boats, surviving hulls

Lakers: bulk carriers 

Lake freighters, or lakers, are bulk carrier vessels which ply the Great Lakes. The best-known variety is the oreboat, depicted in songs from Gordon Lightfoot, Stan Rogers and others. Some classic-design lakers still operate, including a few with steam engines.

SS Col. James M Schoonmaker (Toledo, Ohio) 
Col. James M. Schoonmaker sailed from 1911 to 1980. She was first owned by the Shenango Furnace Company under her present name and was sold to the Cleveland-Cliffs Iron Company, which renamed her Willis B Boyer. Col. James M. Schoonmaker was the largest bulk freighter in the world when commissioned. In an ambitious restoration, Col James M. Schoonmaker was re-christened with its original name July 1, 2011, on the 100th anniversary of the ship's launching in Toledo, Ohio. In October 2012, she was moved with great fanfare from her longtime berth at International Park in Toledo downriver to a site next to the new home of the National Museum of the Great Lakes. Ship and museum which opened to the public in Spring 2014.

SS William G Mather (Cleveland, Ohio) 
William G. Mather was a laker built in 1925 and a former flagship for the Cleveland-Cliffs Iron Company. It is now a maritime museum, open to the public, in Cleveland's North Coast Harbor.

SS William A Irvin (Duluth, Minnesota) 

 was named for the president of U.S. Steel at the time of its launching. It was the first laker with a welded design, and served as the flagship of US Steel's Great Lakes fleet from her launch in 1938 until 1975. It is open for tours at the Great Lakes Floating Maritime Museum in Duluth.

SS Meteor (1896—Superior, Wisconsin) 
 is the last surviving ship using whaleback design; she is a museum in Superior, home of the American Steel Barge Company (where 33 out of the 44 total whalebacks were built starting in 1891).

SS Valley Camp (Sault Ste. Marie, Michigan) 
 was a typical oreboat, who served the National Steel Corporation, Republic Steel Corporation and Wilson Transit Co. during her 1917–1966 working life. In 1968, she became a museum ship on the waterfront of Sault Ste. Marie, downstream of the Soo Locks.

Passenger-freight steamers

SS Keewatin (Port McNicoll, Ontario) 
 is a former Canadian Pacific passenger liner. Built in Scotland in 1907, the boat steamed between Fort William and Port McNicoll for over 50 years until she was sold for scrap in 1967. Saved from the wrecker's torch, Keewatin was towed to Saugatuck, Michigan for use as a museum in 1968. She is the last unmodified Great Lakes passenger liner in existence, and an example of Edwardian luxury. Keewatin is one of the world's last coal-fired steamships. A June 24, 2007 Toronto Star article documented a Canadian effort to see the steamer returned to Dominion waters as a museum ship at Port McNicoll. The effort to repatriate "The Kee" bore fruit on June 23, 2012 (100 years to the day after she first entered Port McNicoll), when the ship returned to her former berth before a crowd of thousands.

SS Milwaukee Clipper (Muskegon, Michigan) 
, another passenger steamer. The Clipper is the last Great Lakes American Passenger Ship of her kind. The SD Milwaukee Clipper was built in 1904 as the SS Juniata, She carried 350 passengers and cargo between Buffalo, NY, and Duluth, MN from 1905 through 1936, when she was tied up with an uncertain future. In 1940, the SS Juniata was purchased and was sent to Manitowoc Shipbuilding Co, to be rebuilt with an all-steel superstructure. She was christened as the SS Milwaukee Clipper in 1941, and carried 900 passengers and 120 automobiles between Muskegon, MI, and Milwaukee, WI. The run lasted until 1970 when she was pulled out of service. After 1970 the ship was saved as an attraction in Chicago. Later, she was moved to Hammond, IN, where the ship was going to be used as a casino. The Clipper was named a National Historic Landmark in 1989. The Clipper was brought back to Muskegon MI,  in 1997 to be used as a museum and banquet/convention center where she sits today. The Clipper retains the last American-Built Quadruple Expansion Steam Engine.

MS Norgoma (Sault Ste. Marie, Ontario) 
MS Norgoma, berthed in the Sault Ste. Marie, Ontario, was built as a steamer carrying freight and passengers in 1950. She ran from Owen Sound to Sault Ste. Marie from 1950 to 1963 on the "Turkey Trail". In 1963 Norgoma was converted to a car ferry, her former role taken over by trucks, buses and automobiles, and she ran between Tobermory and Manitoulin Island. At this time, Norgoma was converted to diesel power. She became a museum ship in 1977.

SS Norisle (Manitoulin Island, Ontario) 
 is a museum ship berthed permanently at the Manitowaning Heritage Complex. It is one of three surviving ships, the others being Norgoma and Normac. It was built in 1946, the first ship built in post-World War II Canada using engines intended for a Royal Canadian destroyer. Norisle ran until 1974, when it was replaced by MS Chi-Cheemaun. Plans call for towing and scuttling Norisle as a tourist dive site. A 200-member group, Friends of The Norisle, has formed to oppose her sinking and supportive articles and letters to the editor have appeared in the Manitoulin Expositor.

Passenger and excursion steamers

SS Columbia (Detroit, Michigan) 
 is a former Boblo Island excursion boat, built in 1902, which has been in storage since 1991.  A New York City group intends to save Columbia and use it on the Hudson River, like the old Hudson day steamers (all of which have been lost).

SS Ste Claire (Detroit) 
, a former Boblo Island excursion boat, was built in 1910. Like her Bob-Lo Amusement Park running mate  Columbia, she was designed by Frank Kirby. In July, 2018 an apparently accidental fire destroyed most of her remaining wooden superstructure. Her future afterward was unassuaged.

Railroad and auto ferries

SS City of Milwaukee (Manistee, Michigan) 
 was a railroad ferry of the Grand Trunk Milwaukee Car Ferry Company which was built in 1931 to replace a previous ferry (lost in 1929 with all hands). She sailed for the company for 40 years (and another five for the Ann Arbor Railroad) before laying up in Frankfort in 1982, where she remained until being sold as a museum. Later moved to her present berth in Manistee, she is open for tours as the last unmodified, classic railroad ferry.

Trillium (Toronto, Ontario) 
The side-wheel steam ferry  (1910), reactivated in 1976, calls Toronto home. Several vintage 1930s screw ferries serve alongside her.

Tugboats and workboats
Their small size and hardy construction make tugboats a favorite as museum ships. Their smaller size means lower maintenance costs (and maintenance can often be performed by volunteer crews). Three steam tugs survive, in addition to three former Army tugs later used for other purposes.

Steam tug Edna G (Two Harbors, Minnesota) 
The steam tugboat Edna G is in retirement as a floating display. Built in 1896, it was one of the last operating steam tugboats on the Great Lakes and is on the National Register of Historic Places.

Steam tug Ned Hanlan (Toronto) 
The steam tug  has been preserved ashore as a static display on the grounds of the Canadian National Exhibition. Launched in 1932, the tug is one of three preserved Great Lakes steam tugs (the others are James Whalen and Edna G. It was named for the rower Ned Hanlan.

United States Army tug LT-5 (Oswego, New York) 
The former World War II United States Army tugboat Major Elisha K. Henson, built in 1943, participated in the Normandy landings. An operational floating display, it worked as a commercial tug (Nash) for 30 years.

United States Army Corps tug Bayfield (Duluth, Minnesota) 

A United States Army Corps of Engineers tugboat, Bayfield, serves as a popular photo shoot at Duluth's Canal Park.

United States Army Corps Tug Ludington (Kewaunee, Wisconsin) 
The former United States Army Corps of Engineers tugboat Tug Ludington, built as an Army tug in 1943, also partook in the D-Day invasion at Normandy. A non-operational floating display, it is supervised by ex-Major Wilbur Browder.

Tug John Purves (Sturgeon Bay, Wisconsin) 
The 1919 tug Butterfield was built for World War I, but was sold for the Lake Superior pulpwood trade. During World War II, the boat was taken into government service as the USAT Butterfield, LT-145, serving in the Gulf of Alaska and the Bering Sea. The Roen Steamship Company acquired the tug, renaming it John Purves (after the firm's general manager) and using it as a salvage vessel. It was later donated to the Door County Maritime Museum.

Steam tug James Whalen (Thunder Bay, Ontario) 
The 1905 icebreaking tugboat James Whalen serves as a popular photo shoot at Kaministiquia Park. She was rescued in 1977, after she was slated for scrapping.

Tug Ohio (Toledo, Ohio) 
Great Lakes Towing Company tug Ohio was built in 1903 as MFDS No.15 it operated as MFDS No.15 until it was retired in 1948 and sold to Great Lakes Towing, who then renamed her Lauren C Turner. She was renamed to Ohio in 1973 she would operate until 2015 when she was taken out of service. In 2018 she was towed from Cleveland to Toledo, where she was converted into a museum ship at the National Museum of The Great Lakes.

Tug Ancaster (Owen Sound, Ontario)  
The Small warping tug Ancaster was built in 1951 operating under 3 owners and sinking once in 1979 but was raised in 1982 serving until 1991 when she became a permanent display at the Owen Sound Marine & Rail Museum she is famous in Canada for appearing on the back of the 1 dollar bill.

Tug Oconto (Burns Harbor, Indiana) 
Built for the US army in 1953 as the ST-2162 she would transferred to the US Army Corps of Engineers and renamed Oconto and would serve with the Army for many years and would serve at the port of Burns Harbor for a few years before being brought on land to be a permanent display.

Tug Wilhem Baum (South Haven, Michigan) 
Built in 1923 as the Capitan A Canfield for the US Army Corps of engineers serving with them until 1961. In 1965 she was bought by the King Company and renamed Julie Dee and then sold again to Beacon Contracting in 2003. She was retired and donated to the Michigan Maritime museum but sank at her dock in 2014. She was raised in 2016 and restored. She is now out of the water as a permeant display.

Naval ships
The Great Lakes are home to a large number of naval craft serving as museums (including five submarines, two destroyers and a cruiser). The Great Lakes are not known for submarine activity, but the undersea service fires the imagination of many. Three former army tugs are museums, having come to the lakes in commercial roles.

USS Cobia (Manitowoc, Wisconsin)
The World War II submarine  is operated by the Wisconsin Maritime Museum, and is a good example of submarine restoration. It features the oldest radar set in the world.

USS Cod (Cleveland, Ohio)
 is a World War II  which was brought to Cleveland, Ohio in 1959 as a training platform for Navy Reservists. Cod is a National Historic Landmark, also a memorial to the 3,900 submariners lost in their nation's service during the century of the US Navy's Submarine Force. She was awarded seven battle stars for wartime service. Cod is the only World War II Fleet submarine that is still intact and in her wartime configuration. Cod has been a museum ship in Cleveland's North Coast Harbor since 1 May 1976.

USS Croaker (Buffalo, NY)
The World War II submarine  was brought to Buffalo in 1988, where it serves alongside USS The Sullivans and USS Little Rock. It was modernized in 1953 as a hunter-killer submarine during the Cold War, and resides at the Buffalo Naval and Military Park.

HMCS Haida (Hamilton, Ontario)
The destroyer  is one of two surviving Canadian World War II warships.

USS Little Rock (Buffalo)
A Cold-War-era cruiser,  is one of three cruisers preserved as museum ships in the US. It resides at the Buffalo Naval and Military Park.

LST-393 (Muskegon, Michigan)
LST-393, a World War II tank landing ship launched in 1943, is available for tours at West Michigan Dock and Market in Muskegon. With the camouflage paint she wore at the end of the war, the ship worked as an automobile ferry between 1947 and 1973 as MV Highway 16 (after US Route 16, which was bridged by the ship between Muskegon and Milwaukee, Wisconsin). It was awarded  three battle stars for war service.

HMCS Ojibwa "S72" (Port Burwell, Ontario)
S72 HMCS Ojibwa S72 was an Oberon-class submarine, laid down as HMS Onyx at Chatham Dockyard in Chatham, Kent, UK. It was purchased by Canada in 1962 and commissioned into the Canadian navy in 1965, served primarily in the Maritime Forces Atlantic until its decommissioning in 1998.

USS Silversides (Muskegon)
The World War II submarine  was displayed at Chicago's Navy Pier. It moved to Muskegon in 1987.

USS  The Sullivans (Buffalo)
The World War II   was named for five brothers killed in the line of duty. It earned nine battle stars in World War II and two for Korean War service. It resides at the Buffalo Naval and Military Park.

U-boat U-505 (Chicago, Illinois)
The  was captured during World War II, allowing the Allies to capture its code books and the German Enigma code machine. Slated for sinking after the war for gunnery practice, the sub was instead donated to Chicago's Museum of Science and Industry. It was later moved inside to a climate-controlled environment (undergoing an extensive restoration), and was re-opened to the public in 2005.

Large government vessels

USCGC Acacia (Manistee, Michigan)
 is a retired buoy tender with icebreaking capabilities serving as a museum ship moored near the railroad car ferry, SS City of Milwaukee. The World War II-vintage vessel is a tribute to the black-painted workhorses of the United States Coast Guard. A ribbon-cutting (announcing the ship's new role as a museum ship) was celebrated in Manistee on August 13, 2011.

BFD Edward M Cotter (Buffalo)
This 1900 Buffalo Fire Department fireboat, still in use for firefighting and icebreaking, is a National Historic Landmark.

MS Georgian Queen (Penetanguishene, Ontario) 
Georgian Queen is a former Canadian Coast Guard icebreaking cutter which has been converted into a tour boat.

CCG Alexander Henry (Thunder Bay, Ontario) 
Former Canadian Coast Guard icebreaker  resides at the Marine Museum of the Great Lakes as a display and a bed-and-breakfast. Launched in 1958, she and the former USCGC Mackinaw serve as the Great Lakes' two surviving large red-hulled icebreakers.

USCGC Mackinaw (Mackinaw City, Michigan) 
 is a  vessel designed for icebreaking duties on the Great Lakes. Mackinaw was home-ported in Cheboygan, Michigan during its active service. Due to Mackinaws age and expensive upkeep, the cutter was decommissioned and replaced with a smaller multipurpose cutter (which was commissioned in Cheboygan the same day). The old Mackinaw moved under its own power on June 21, 2006 from the port of its decommissioning to a permanent berth (at the  dock) at the ship's namesake port, Mackinaw City, Michigan, where she now serves as the Icebreaker Mackinaw Maritime Museum.

USCGC McLane (Muskegon, Michigan) 
USCGC McLane (WSC-146) was a "buck and a quarter" cutter designed to chase rum-runners during Prohibition. During World War II it served out of Ketchikan, Alaska and is credited with sinking the Japanese submarine RO-32. A Chicago-based Sea Scout troop acquired McLane after it was decommissioned in 1969, and the Great Lakes Naval Memorial and Museum acquired the cutter in 1993.

Port Huron Lightship 
Located ashore at the head of the St Clair River in Port Huron, it is the Great Lakes' one surviving lightvessel.

At-risk vessel 
The following historic museum ship did face an uncertain future:
, a former museum ship, was offered for sale by its owner (the Port Huron Museum). In November 2017, Bramble was moved to Port Huron, MI, where it currently functions as a museum ship.

Surviving partial ships 
SS Ridgetown was partially sunk as a breakwater (with stack and cabins intact) near Toronto, at Port Credit. Built in 1905 as SS William E. Corey, it is one of the oldest surviving hulls on the lake. There are only few ships older, such as the J. B. Ford. Its silhouette is an example of the appearance of early-1900s bulk carriers.
Benson Ford was named after Henry Ford's grandson, and was the 1924 flagship of the Ford Motor Company. The pilot house is located in Put-in-Bay, Ohio, a private museum residence owned by Bryan Kasper of Sandusky, Ohio. It has been featured in magazines and on television shows, such as HGTV's Extreme Homes, MTV Cribs and the Travel Channel's Extreme Vacation Homes. The pagoda-style cabin of the Ford provides a glimpse of what one of the largest freighters on the lakes looked like.
The steamer Lewis G Harrimans bow and bow superstructure are preserved in Detour, Michigan. Lewis G Harriman (launched as the purpose-built cement steamer John W Board) was scrapped, but the bow was saved as a residence. It was restored in the Board's colors.
The pilot house of William Clay Ford is part of the Dossin Great Lakes Museum on Belle Isle, Detroit. The bulk freighter was built in 1952 and scrapped in 1987.
The past warship, converted into a Great Lakes freighter, SS Joseph H Thompsons pilot house was removed when being converted to a barge.
SS Amasa Stone was partially sunk as a breakwater at Charlevoix, Michigan. She was built in 1905, and she is one of the oldest surviving hulls on the Great Lakes. Before sinking everything was removed from the ship including the Superstructure.
 was a Great Lakes bulk freighter that was built in 1914. She was decommissioned in 1970 and was turned into a stationary crane ship that functioned until 2015 when the ship was towed to the Menominee river awaiting scrapping.
She sailed from 1900, to 1962 when she was sunk as a breakwater at Cleveland, Ohio where she was buried under 39 feet of dredgings from the Cuyahoga River.
She was sunk on July 4, 1960 in Ontario Place where she remains to this day. She is the oldest surviving hull on the Great Lakes.
The pilot house from the Thomas Walters survives as part of the Ashtabula Maritime & Surface Transportation Museum in Ashtabula, Ohio.
The Pilot house of the Irvan L. Clymer is located on Pier B in Duluth, Minnesota. Built in 1917 and scrapped in 1994 the Irvan L. Clymers pilot house sits at the end of the pier.
The pilot house of the Frontanec (1966) is preserved in Two Harbors, Minnesota after the Frontanec ran aground in 1979 and scrapped in 1985 in Duluth Minnesota her pilot house now sits near the light house at Two Harbors. The Frontanecs original pilot house from 1923 is now preserved in Fairport Harbor, Ohio the original pilot house was removed during the 1966 1967 Season winter layup.
The pilot house of the George Himdman is on display in Duluth Minnesota in service from 1950 to 1987 being scrapped overseas her pilot house now serves as a bike rental shop.

Failed museum attempts (ships scrapped)
Several other lakers nearly became museums but, due to funding, political opposition or other causes, were scrapped:
SS Alabama: Goodrich Transit Line steamer later cut down as a barge, scrapped in 2009
SS Canadiana: Crystal Beach Park boat scrapped after preservationist opposition
 Three-masted schooner SV : Built in 1846 for the lumber trade, she sank in Green Bay in 1864. She was raised in 1965 and brought to Menominee, Michigan as a museum. After years of neglect, she was dismantled in 1998.
SS John Ericsson: The penultimate whaleback freighter, John Ericsson was scrapped in 1969 in Hamilton, Ontario. Politics, as was the case with Canadiana, played a central role in the loss of the ship.
Wrecking tug Favorite: The Great Lakes' best-known salvage tug, likened to SS Foundation Franklin in the Canadian Maritimes. An attempt to save it at Sault Ste. Marie (next to  failed when state funding failed to materialize and the riveted hull began to leak. She was scrapped in Detour Township, Michigan.
Lewis G Harriman: A 1923 purpose-built cement carrier, the first of her kind, which sailed from her launch until 1980. Used as a storage barge until 2003, a group tried to save her; however, poor communications within the company saw the ship sold in 2004 and scrapped in Sault Ste. Marie by Purvis Marine. The majority of the hull was fed to the Algoma Steel Mill but the forecastle was saved as a summer cottage at Detour, Michigan.
Lansdowne and Huron: The paddlewheel steam railroad ferry Lansdowne, built in 1884, was modified to support a restaurant in antique rail cars; Huron, built in 1875, sank at a pier in Erie, Pennsylvania. The hull was raised, but little other information about the future of the vessel is available. The hull was towed to Buffalo, New York in July 2006; however, in winter 2008 Buffalo Mayor Byron Brown called it an eyesore and demanded its removal. Lansdowne was scrapped in July 2008.
SS Niagara: Built in 1897, the freighter was later converted into a sand-sucker. Scrapped in 1997 by Liberty Iron & Metal in Erie, Pennsylvania (after a failed attempt to convert her into an Erie museum), she had been saved from the scrapyard 11 years earlier.
SS Seaway Queen: The Canadian straight decker Seaway Queen, formerly owned by Upper Lakes Shipping, was involved in an attempt to save her as a museum. The company failed to locate an organization capable and willing to preserve her; she was sold and scrapped in Alang, India in 2004.
SS Chief Wawatam: A historic icebreaker and the last hand-fired coal steamer on the Great Lakes, Chief Wawatam was cut down to a barge and finally scrapped by its owner (Purvis Marine of Sault Ste Marie, Ontario).
 Three-masted schooner J.T. Wing: Last commercial sailing ship on the Great Lakes, she was used briefly in the lumber trade. She served as a training vessel before being grounded on Belle Isle in 1949 as a museum ship, and was burned before a crowd of 6,000 in 1956.
E M Ford, a cement steamer, was scrapped in November 2008.
J B Ford, a cement steamer, was scrapped in 2015 after a failed attempt to save her. She was the oldest floating ship on the great lakes at the time of her scrapping.

Potential museums 

, launched in 1952, is still running. She had the last contact with Edmund Fitzgerald before the latter sank, and was the first would-be rescue vessel to search for Edmund Fitzgerald.
Cement steamers: The cement fleet of steamers is being supplanted by tug-barge combinations like Integrity and Innovation. Historic cement steamers include, St. Mary's Challenger (1906),J.A.W. Iglehart (1936) and Alpena (1942).
Ore Carriers: The many ore boats of the American and Canadian fleets is filled with many different old and new ore carriers. Historical ore carriers include Herbert C Jackson (1959), Wilfred Sykes (1949),  Cason J Callaway (1952), Lee A. Tregurtha (1942), Saginaw (1953), SS John Sherwin (1958), Cuyahoga (1943),  (1960), American Valor (1953),  (1952), and the John G Munson (1952)
Tugs: Many tugs on the lakes are currently older than many of the freighters on the lakes some even were built before 1900. Historical Tugs  include Georgia (1897), Manitou (1943), Rocket (1901), Arkansas (1909), John M. Selvick (1898), Anchor Bay (1953), Gregory J. Busch (1919), Olive L. Moore (1928), MT Undaunted (1944),  (1915), and the Radium Yellowknife (1948)
: 1902 fire tug converted into a passenger-packet steamer for the Owen Sound Transportation Company. Her larger running mates (Norisle and Norgoma) have been converted into museum ships. After a stint as a floating restaurant in Toronto which ended when she was accidentally rammed by a ferry, Normac was towed to Port Dalhousie, Ontario, where she serves as a floating cocktail lounge.

References

External links 
 Benson Ford Shiphouse
 Boatnerd website
 Willis B Boyer website
 William G. Mather website
 Valley Camp website
 Norisle website
  Great Lakes Naval Memorial & Museum - USS Silversides & USCGC McLane
 SS Keewatin
 Image of ex-SS Lewis G. Harriman partially converted into a cottage as of 2010 on Shipspotting.com.

+
Museum and historic ships
Lists of ships
Great Lakes museum and historic ships
Ships
Lists of museums in the United States